This is a list of dragons in mythology and folklore.

African dragons

American dragons

European dragons 
This is a list of European dragons.

Northeast Asian dragons

Oceanian dragons

South Asian dragons

Southeast Asian dragons

West Asian dragons

Common dragons with unknown origin 

 Azazel from the Abrahamic religions, is described as a dragon in the Apocalypse of Abraham.
 Sea serpent, a water dragon found worldwide.
The unnamed five-headed dragon subdued by the Buddhist goddess Benzaiten at Enoshima in Japan in A.D. 552
 The unnamed dragon defeated by Saint George.
Cockatrice, a two-legged dragon or serpent-like creature with a rooster's head.
Basilisk, a legendary reptile reputed to be a serpent king, who can cause death with a single glance.

Other serpentine creatures in mythology and folklore 

 Brnensky drak (The dragon of Brno, Czech), the dragon killed nearby Moravian city (legend)
 The Ljubljana dragon, the protector dragon of Ljubljana, capital of Slovenia.

See also
 Dragons in Manipuri mythology
List of dragons in literature
List of dragons in popular culture

References

Further reading
 Barber, Elizabeth Wayland, and Paul T. Barber. "Fire-Breathing Dragons." In When They Severed Earth from Sky: How the Human Mind Shapes Myth, 231–44. PRINCETON; OXFORD: Princeton University Press, 2004. doi:10.2307/j.ctt7rt69.22.
 Blust, Robert. "The Origin of Dragons." Anthropos 95, no. 2 (2000): 519–36. www.jstor.org/stable/40465957.
 Stein, Ruth M. "The Changing Styles in Dragons—from Fáfnir to Smaug." Elementary English 45, no. 2 (1968): 179–89. www.jstor.org/stable/41386292.

 
mythology